Donald Pandiangan (12 December 1945 – 20 August 2008) was an Indonesian archer. He competed at the 1976 and 1984 Summer Olympics. As an athlete, he was earned the nickname Indonesian Robin Hood for winning the Sea Games 4 times.

References

1945 births
2008 deaths
Indonesian male archers
Olympic archers of Indonesia
Archers at the 1976 Summer Olympics
Archers at the 1984 Summer Olympics
Sportspeople from North Sumatra
Archers at the 1978 Asian Games
Archers at the 1982 Asian Games
Asian Games medalists in archery
Asian Games silver medalists for Indonesia
Asian Games bronze medalists for Indonesia
Medalists at the 1978 Asian Games
Medalists at the 1982 Asian Games
20th-century Indonesian people